The initials PNB could stand for:

 Pacific Northwest Ballet, Seattle, Washington
 Pacific Northwest Bell, a former division of AT&T Corporation and then US West
 Parti National Basque, the Basque National Party
 Parti National Breton, the Breton National Party
 Parti Nationaliste Breton, the Breton Nationalist Party
 Partners for a New Beginning
 Pemodalan Nasional Berhad, in Malaysia
 Philippine National Bank in the Philippines
 Police notebook, used by police
 Police Negotiating Board
 Punjab National Bank in India
 Philadelphia National Bank, renamed to CoreStates
 ISO 639 code for Pakistani Punjabi language (lower case letters)
 Pottery Neolithic B, a division of the Pottery Neolithic period in archaeology